The National Defence Academy (NDA) is the joint defence service training institute of the Indian Armed Forces, where cadets of the three services i.e. the Indian Army, the Indian Navy and the Indian Air Force train together before they go on to respective service academy for further pre-commission training. The NDA is located in Khadakwasla, Pune, Maharashtra. It is the first tri-service academy in the world.

The alumni of NDA include 3 Param Vir Chakra recipients and 12 Ashoka Chakra recipients. NDA has also produced 27 service Chiefs of Staff till date. The current Chiefs of Staff of the Army, the Navy and the Air Force are all NDA alumni from the same course. The 137th course graduated on 30 November 2019, consisting of 188 Army cadets, 38 Naval cadets, 37 Air Force cadets and 20 cadets from friendly foreign countries. The Supreme Court of India passed an order in August 2021 that allowed female candidates to appear for the all upcoming NDA entrance examination.

History

At the end of the World War II, Field Marshal Claude Auchinleck, then Commander-in-Chief of the Indian Army, drawing on experiences of the army during the war, led a committee around the world and submitted a report to the Government of India in December 1946. The committee recommended the establishment of a Joint Services Military Academy, with training modelled on the United States Military Academy at West Point.

After the independence of India in August 1947, the Chiefs of Staff Committee immediately implemented the recommendations of the Auchinleck report. The committee initiated an action plan in late 1947 to commission a permanent defence academy and began the search for a suitable site. It also decided to set up an interim training academy, known as the Joint Services Wing (JSW), which was commissioned on 1 January 1949 at the Armed Forces Academy (now known as the Indian Military Academy) in Dehradun. Initially, after two years of training at the JSW, Army cadets went on to the Military wing of the Armed Forces Academy for two years of further pre-commission training, while the Navy and Air Force cadets were sent to Britannia Royal Naval College Dartmouth and Royal Air Force College Cranwell in the United Kingdom for further training.

In 1941, Lord Linlithgow, the then Viceroy of India, received a gift of £100,000 from a grateful Sudanese Government towards building a war memorial in recognition of the sacrifices of Indian troops in the liberation of Sudan in the East African campaign during World War II. Following partition, India's share amounted to £70,000 (Rs 14 Lakh at the time; the remaining £30,000 went to Pakistan). The Indian Army decided to use these funds to partly cover the cost of construction of the NDA. The foundation stone for the academy was laid by then Prime Minister of India, Jawaharlal Nehru on 6 October 1949. Construction started in October 1949. The revised estimated cost for the whole project was Rs 6.45 crores respectively. The National Defence Academy was formally commissioned on 7 December 1954, with an inauguration ceremony held on 16 January 1955. The 10th JSW program was transferred from Clement Town, Dehradun to NDA Khadagwasla.It is the first tri-service academy in the world.

Campus

The NDA campus is located about 17 km south-west of Pune city, north-west of Khadakwasla Lake with the Sinhagad Fort providing a panoramic backdrop. It spans  of the  donated by the Government of former Bombay State. While many states had offered land for a permanent place for the Academy, Bombay got the honour, donating the most land including a lake and neighboring hilly terrain. The site was also chosen for its proximity to the Arabian Sea and other military establishments, an operational air base nearby at Lohagaon as well as the salubrious climate. The existence of an old combined-forces training center and a disused mock landing ship, HMS Angostura, on the north bank of the Khadakwasla lake which had been used to train troops for amphibious landings, lent additional leverage for the selection of the site.

The administrative headquarters of the NDA was named the Sudan Block, in honour of the sacrifices of Indian soldiers in the Sudan theatre during the East African campaign. It was inaugurated by then Ambassador of Sudan to India, Rahmatullah Abdulla, on 30 May 1959. The building is a 3-storey basalt and granite structure constructed with Jodhpur red sandstone. Its architecture features an exterior design comprising a blend of arches, pillars and verandahs, topped by a dome. The foyer has white Italian marble flooring and panelling on the interior walls.
NDA has an excellent infrastructure for all-round training of cadets and a vast array of facilities like spacious and well-maintained classrooms, well-equipped labs, three Olympic size swimming pools, gymnasiums, 32 football fields, two polo grounds, a cricket stadium and a number of squash and tennis courts. The academic year is divided into two terms, viz. Spring (January to May) and Autumn (July to December). A cadet must undergo training for a total of six terms before graduating from the NDA.

Administration

Commandants

The Commandant of the National Defence Academy is the head and overall in-charge of the academy. The Commandant is a three-star rank officer from the three Services in rotation. Major General Thakur Mahadeo Singh, DSO was the first commandant of JSW at IMA. Major General Enaith Habibullah was the last head of the JSW and the First Commandant of NDA at Pune. Vice Admiral Ajay Kochhar, AVSM, NM is the present commandant.

Procedure for the selection of Cadets
Applicants to the NDA are selected via a written exam conducted by the UPSC every year, followed by extensive interviews by the Services Selection Board covering general aptitude, psychological testing, team skills, leadership qualities as well as physical and social skills, along with medical tests. Incoming classes are accepted twice a year for semesters starting in July and January. About 4,00,000 applicants sit for each written exam every year. Typically, about 6,300 of these are invited to interview and finally 300-350 are selected to attend the course. The minimum age should be 16 and half years and maximum age should be 19 and half years. The  number of students who were  admitted to the Joint Services Wing of the National Defence Academy during 1953-54 is 572. Total application received in UPSC 6,061.

Applicants who join the Air Force through the flying branch also go through a test called Computerized Pilot Selection System or CPSS for short.

Cadets who are accepted and successfully complete the program are sent to their respective training academies for one year of training before granting of commission: army cadets go to Indian Military Academy (IMA) at Dehradun, air force cadets to Air Force Academy (AFA) at Dundigal, Hyderabad, and naval cadets to Indian Naval Academy (INA) at Ezhimala, Kerala.

Squadrons and Battalions
A cadet is allotted to one of the 18 Squadrons.

No. 1 Battalion: Alpha Squadron, Bravo Squadron, Charlie Squadron and Delta Squadron.
No. 2 Battalion: Echo Squadron, Foxtrot Squadron, Golf Squadron and Hunter Squadron.
No. 3 Battalion: India Squadron, Juliet Squadron, Kilo Squadron and Lima Squadron.
No. 4 Battalion: Mike Squadron, November Squadron, Oscar Squadron and Panther Squadron.
No 5 Battalion: Quebec Squadron, Romeo Squadron

Each squadron has approximately 100 to 120 cadets drawn from senior as well as junior courses under training in the Academy.

As the number of cadets joining the NDA increased annually, the Defence Ministry of India sanctioned the raising of 16th, 17th and 18th squadrons in 2012, with the initial letter of their names being "P", "Q" and "R" respectively. 

The prestigious Inter Squadron Championship Trophy is awarded to the best Squadron. The champion squadron has the proud tradition of possession of the Champion banner for one term, which is carried during the parade and other sports meets. Each Squadron has its own nickname, an individual identity with a richly textured history and mascot. The rudimentary import of the NDA's motto "Service before Self" is first taught in the environs of the Squadron, where a cadet learns the importance of putting the Squadron's requirements well above his own.

Academy Honour Code 
The cadets in the NDA live by a strict honour code which guides them through their rigorous training schedule.

Academy Prayer 

The NDA Prayer is religion agnostic. Rather than praying to God of any specific religion, the prayer has been modeled to seek blessings for performing duty to the country and remain morally straight. The prayer also seeks blessings for granting opportunities of service to the country and the men the cadets would go on to lead and over all to place 'service before self'.

Curriculum

Academics
The NDA offers only a full-time, residential undergraduate program. Cadets are awarded a Baccalaureate degree (a Bachelor of Arts or a Bachelor of Science) and a Bachelor of Technology degree for Naval Cadets after 3 years of study. Naval cadets complete their fourth year of B.Tech from Indian Naval Academy, while Air Force cadets complete their fourth year of B.Tech from the Indian Air Force Academy. Further, the Cadets have a choice of two streams of study. The Science stream offers studies in physics, chemistry, mathematics and computer science. The Humanities (Liberal Arts) stream offers studies in history, economics, political science, geography and languages.

In both streams, academic studies are split into three categories.
 In the Compulsory Course, cadets study English, Foreign Languages (Arabic, Chinese, French or Russian), physics, chemistry, mathematics, computer science, history, political science, economics and geography. Note that all cadets must take basic classes in all these subjects except foreign languages. Cadets then take advanced classes depending on their chosen stream.
 The Foundation Course is mandatory and comprises Military Studies and General Studies. Subjects such as military history, military geography, weapons systems and armaments, etc. are covered in Military Studies. Subjects such as geopolitics, human rights, Laws of Armed Conflict and environmental sciences are covered in General Studies.
 The Optional Course focuses on subjects specific to the cadet's chosen Service.

Cadets spend the first four semesters on the Compulsory Course and the Foundation Course. They take the Optional Course during the fifth and sixth semesters. They may transfer to other Service academies for the optional courses.

Training
All the cadets joining the NDA after their 10+2 Examination are trained in the Academy for three years culminating in graduation with BA(or)BSc or BCs (Computer Science) degree of Jawaharlal Nehru University & University of Delhi; the first course to be awarded degrees was the 46th course in 1974. Apart from academic training they are also trained in outdoor skills, like Drill, PT and games; apart from one of the foreign languages up to the lower B1 level (according to the international standards).

Joint service training

Air Force 

The Air Force Training Team (AFTT) aims at training Air Force cadets in the basics of military aviation through ground training and flying training. Ground training is conducted with the help of modern training aids, aircraft models, and cross-sectional models of aero-engines and ng consists of a minimum of eight sorties on the Super Dimona aircraft. Cadets also get exposure to deflection firing through Skeet shooting. Visits to key Air Force training establishments, Air Force Stations, and civil aviation centers are also undertaken to give cadets first-hand experience of aviation activities. Visits to Air Force Academy, Air Wing at Indian Armament Technology, Air Base at Pune, and College of Military Engineering are organized to enable the Air Force cadets to appreciate the Air Force aspects. Flying training at the AFTT is fully backed by an Automatic Weather Station, Air Traffic Control Station, a paved runway, and dispersal for six aircraft.

The AFTT was formed towards the end of 1956. The aim of the AFTT is to introduce the VI Term cadets to gliding and allied professional subjects, which in turn prepares them for their professional training in the Air Force flying establishments. Over the last 60 years, gliding training has evolved into flying training. Five different classes of gliders were acquired by the Academy since 1957. They are Sedberg T-21B, Baby Eon, Eon Olympica, Rohini and Ardhra gliders. All these gliders with the exception of the Baby Eon and Eon Olympics were utilized in the flying training of the cadets.

The Sedberg T-21B was the mainstay of the AFTT in glider flying with each cadet being permitted a total of 60 training launches, after which 2-3 mandatory Solo Check launches were flown with the Chief Flying Instructor (CFI). Cadets cleared for solo flying flew one solo trip on the glider and were then formally awarded their 'Wings', exactly half the size of the official Indian Air Force wings, which were worn above the left shirt pocket of their formal uniforms. Sandbags were used as ballast in place of the absent instructor.

The cadet who went solo with the lowest number of launches was usually awarded the Best In Gliding Trophy on the Guest Dining-in Night, one night prior to the Passing Out Parade. The Air Force cadet who stood first in Ground Subjects was awarded the Sqn Ldr Vasudev Memorial Book Prize that same night.

The induction of Super Dimona in 2001 is a watershed moment in the history of AFTT introducing a huge jump in the quality of training. A "gliderdrome" runway was widened to 100’ and extended to 5000’ from earlier dimensions of 50’X 3000’ which is maintained within the premises of the NDA by the AFTT. The Air Force cadets of the academy now learn the basics of flying training at this facility on the Diamond Super Dimona HK36 aircraft.

Army 
Cadets are imparted with basic military skills of weapon handling, firing, field engineering, tactics and map reading. The learning imparted acts as a foundation for the army cadets for their further training at IMA and various service courses. The method of training imparted is both theoretical and practical which includes classes, lectures and demonstrations and exercises for further application of acquired knowledge on the ground.

Camp Green Horn is conducted during the second term for cadets. Camp Rover is conducted  during the fourth term for cadets.

In the sixth term Camp Torna, "recalling the first victory of Shivaji, a teenager" is conducted, where practical aspects are reinforced in simulated field conditions. The cadets are provided with opportunities to demonstrate leadership qualities in various tactical situations.

Navy 

The Naval Training Team (NTT) is the oldest of the Training Teams at the NDA. The main task of the Naval Training Team is to train V and VI term naval cadets on Specialist Service Subjects both theoretical and practical. Naval cadets on completion of their 3 years of training go to Indian Naval Academy (INA) as their finishing academy for 1 year, where they commence their M.Sc degree along with cadets of INA who will be doing B.Tech. From 2015 army and air force cadets get naval training as well.

The major emphasis is laid on Navigation, Seamanship and Communication. A total of 328 theoretical classes are conducted for VI term naval cadets. Theoretical instructions are imparted in the class room at NTT and Peacock Bay by using modern teaching methodology where-in 3D models, Computer Assisted Instruction (CAI) and Computer Based Training (CBT) packages, scaled down models are used. Practical instructions are imparted in the Watermanship Training Centre at Peacock bay during regular periods and during club days. TS Ronnie Pereira, the in-house scale model of a warship helps in imparting training.

In order to orient the cadets to the navy, an orientation visit to Mumbai is conducted prior to the commencement of service training; during which the cadets visit various class of ships, submarines, shop floors, repair facilities etc. As part of the visit the naval cadets are sent to NBCD School to acquaint with fire fighting, damage control aspects. Further, to inculcate competitive spirit and adventurism amongst the cadets, VI term naval cadets are sent to Naval Academy, Ezhimala to take part in Open Sea Whaler Sailing Expedition and interact with their counterparts at the INA.

Camp Varuna during the middle of the term to get a first-hand experience on board during sailing and Camp Varuna II at the end of the term to put the theoretical knowledge acquired at NTT into practical use during the three days' sailing. Watermanship Training Centre includes Yachting, Kayaking, Windsurfing, Rowing, Water-skiing, Ship Modeling.

Passing out 

On 30 November 2022, the passing-out parade of the 143th course of the Academy was held with  cadets graduating. chief of naval staff of India, Admiral R Hari Kumar was the chief guest for the occasion.

Alumni

Alumni of the academy have led and fought in every major conflict in which India has participated since the academy was established. They have an illustrious record of numerous gallantry awards and achieving 3 Param Vir Chakras, 31 Maha Vir Chakras, 160 Vir Chakra, 11 Ashok Chakras, 40 Kirti Chakras and 135 Shaurya Chakras. 11 Chiefs of Army Staff, 10 Chiefs of Naval Staff and 4 Chiefs of Air Staff of the Indian Armed Forces have been NDA alumni .

In the media
The Standard Bearers, a documentary directed and written by Dipti Bhalla and Kunal Verma provides an inside look into the history and operations of the NDA. Another documentary film, My Flag, My Life, written by Ambarnath Sinha and directed by Nandan Khuhyadi and Sanjay Dabke, provides details about the life of NDA cadets, and is intended to create awareness about a career in the armed forces among the young generation. Books depicting NDA include the fictional "Boots Belts Berets" by Tanushree Podder, which is also being adapted into a web series. Outlook reported that over 1200 cadets quit NDA in ten years between January 2008 and November 2017.

See also
 Indian National Defence University
 Military Academies in India
 Sainik School
 Indonesian Army Command and General Staff College

Notes and References

Notes

References

Bibliography 

 

Defence agencies of India
Military academies of India
Educational institutions established in 1954
Universities and colleges in Pune
1954 establishments in Bombay State